Petrishcheva Gora is a rural locality (a village) in Moseyevskoye Rural Settlement, Totemsky  District, Vologda Oblast, Russia. The population was 21 as of 2002.

Geography 
Petrishcheva Gora is located 80 km northwest of Totma (the district's administrative centre) by road. Antusheva Gora is the nearest rural locality.

References 

Rural localities in Tarnogsky District